was a flatland castle located in Echizen, Fukui Prefecture, Japan. The site of the castle is now the Ōtaki Shrine, a shrine to Kawakami Gozen, the Japanese goddess of papermaking.

References 
http://www.geocities.jp/hokuriku1970/ootaki.html

Castles in Fukui Prefecture
Former castles in Japan
Archaeological sites in Japan